The Jebusites (ISO 259-3 Ybusi) were, according to the books of Joshua and Samuel from the Tanakh, a Canaanite tribe that inhabited Jerusalem, then called Jebus (Hebrew:  Yəḇūs, "trampled place") prior to the conquest initiated by Joshua and completed by King David, although a majority of scholars agree that the Book of Joshua holds little historical value for early Israel and most likely reflects a much later period. The Books of Kings as well as 1 Chronicles state that Jerusalem was known as Jebus prior to this event (1 Chronicles 11:4). The identification of Jebus with Jerusalem is sometimes disputed by scholars. According to some biblical chronologies, the city was conquered by King David in 1003 BCE.

Identification of Jebus
The identification of Jebus with Jerusalem has been disputed, principally by Niels Peter Lemche. Supporting his case, every non-biblical mention of Jerusalem found in the ancient Near East refers to the city as "Jerusalem". Also in the Amarna letters, it is called Beth-Shalem, the house of Shalem.

The Sumero-Akkadian name for Jerusalem, uru-salim, is variously etymologised to mean "foundation of [or: by] the god Shalim": from Hebrew/Semitic yry, "to found, to lay a cornerstone", and Shalim, the Canaanite god of the setting sun and the nether world, as well as of health and perfection.

Lemche states:

There is no evidence of Jebus and the Jebusites outside of the Old Testament. Some scholars reckon Jebus to be a different place from Jerusalem; other scholars prefer to see the name of Jebus as a kind of pseudo-ethnic name without any historical background.

Theophilus G. Pinches has noted a reference to "Yabusu", which he interpreted as an old form of Jebus, on a contract tablet that dates from 2200 BC.

Ethnic origin
The Hebrew Bible contains the only surviving ancient text known to use the term Jebusite to describe the pre-Israelite inhabitants of Jerusalem; according to the Table of Nations in the Book of Genesis, the Jebusites are identified as a Canaanite tribe, which is listed in third place among the Canaanite groups, between the biblical Hittites and the Amorites. Prior to modern archaeological studies, most biblical scholars held the opinion that the Jebusites were identical to the Hittites, which continues to be the case, though less so. However, an increasingly popular view, first put forward by Edward Lipinski, professor of Oriental and Slavonic studies at the Catholic University of Leuven, is that the Jebusites were most likely an Amorite tribe; Lipinski identified them with the group referred to as Yabusi'um in a cuneiform letter found in the archive of Mari, Syria. Lipinski also suggested that more than one clan or tribe bore similar names, and thus that the Jebusites and Yabusi'um may have been separate people altogether.

In the Amarna letters, mention is made that the contemporaneous king of Jerusalem was named Abdi-Heba, which is a theophoric name invoking a Hurrian mother goddess named Hebat. This implies that the Jebusites were either Hurrians themselves, or were heavily influenced by Hurrian culture, or were dominated by a Hurrian maryannu class (i.e., a Hurrian warrior-class elite). Moreover, the last Jebusite king of Jerusalem, Araunah/Arawna/Awarna (or Ornan), bore a name generally understood as based on the Hurrian honorific ewir.

Richard Hess (1997:34–6) points to four Hurrian names in the Bible's Conquest narrative: Piram, king of Jarmuth and Hoham, king of Hebron, and Sheshai and Talmai, sons of Anak with Hurrian-based names.

Biblical narrative
The Hebrew Bible describes the Jebusites as dwelling in the mountains besides Jerusalem. In Exodus, the "good and large land, flowing with milk and honey" which was promised to Moses as the future home of the oppressed Hebrew people included the land of the Jebusites. According to the Book of Joshua, Adonizedek led a confederation of Jebusites, and the tribes from the neighbouring cities of Jarmut, Lachish, Eglon and Hebron against Joshua, but was soundly defeated and killed.

However,  states that Judah could not dislodge the Jebusites, who were living in Jerusalem ("to this day the Jebusites live there with the people of Judah").  portrays the Jebusites as continuing to dwell at Jerusalem, within the territory otherwise occupied by the Tribe of Benjamin.

Most modern archaeologists now believe that the conquest of Canaan by the Israelites under Joshua did not represent an external invasion, but that the Israelites originated as a subculture within Canaanite society. 
Some biblical scholars believe that the accounts in the Book of Joshua, compiled in about 600 BC, represent a collection of folk memory  of various conflicts which would have occurred over a time period of over 200 years (8th to 7th centuries BC).

According to the Second Book of Samuel, the Jebusites still had control of Jerusalem at the time of King David, but David wished to take control of the city. Understandably the Jebusites contested his attempt to do this, and since Jebus was the strongest fortress in Canaan they gloated that even the blind and lame could withstand David's siege. According to the version of the story in the Masoretic Text, David managed to conquer the city by a surprise attack, led by Joab, through the water supply tunnels (Jerusalem has no natural water supply except for the Gihon Spring). Ever since its discovery in the 19th century, Warren's Shaft, part of a system which connects the spring to the city, has been cited as evidence for the plausibility of such a line of attack; however, the discovery, at the turn of the 21st century, of a set of heavy fortifications, including towers, around the base of the Warren's Shaft system and the spring, has made archaeologists now regard this line of attack as implausible, as it would be an attack against one of the most heavily fortified parts, and hardly a surprise. The account in 1 Chronicles mentions the advantage of a speedy attack but does not mention use of the water shafts  and according to many textual scholars the claim in the Masoretic Text could simply be a scribal error; the Septuagint version of the passage states that the Israelites had to attack the Jebusites with their dagger[s] rather than through the water shaft.

The Books of Kings state that once Jerusalem had become an Israelite city, the surviving Jebusites were forced by Solomon to become serfs; though since some archaeologists believe that the Israelites were simply an emergent subculture in Canaanite society, it is possible that this is an aetiological explanation for serfs rather than a historically accurate one. It is unknown what ultimately became of these Jebusites.

According to the "Jebusite Hypothesis," however, the Jebusites persisted as inhabitants of Jerusalem and comprised an important faction in the Kingdom of Judah, including such notables as Zadok the priest, Nathan the prophet, and Bathsheba, the queen and mother of the next monarch, Solomon. According to this hypothesis, after the disgrace of a rival Elide faction of priests in the struggle for succession to David, the family of Zadok became the sole authorized Jerusalem clergy, so that a Jebusite family monopolized the Jerusalem clergy for many centuries before becoming sufficiently attenuated to be indistinguishable from other Judeans or Judahites.

The First Book of Chronicles states that the inhabitants of Jebus forbade King David from coming to Jerusalem shortly after he was made king. Joab went up first and took the city and became chief and captain of David's armed forces.

Individuals named in the Bible

Melchizedek
Jerusalem is referred to as Salem rather than Jebus in the passages of Genesis describing Melchizedek. According to Genesis, the ruler of Salem in the time of Abraham was Melchizedek (also Melchizedeq), and that as well as being a ruler, he was also a priest. The Mediæval French Rabbi Rashi believed that Melchizedek was another name for Shem, son of Noah, despite Abraham's supposed descent from the line of Shem's son Arphaxad. Later, Joshua is described as defeating a Jebusite king named Adonizedek. The first parts of their names mean king and lord, respectively, but though the zedek part can be translated as righteous (making the names my king is righteous and my lord is righteous). Scholars are uncertain, however, whether Melchizedek was himself intended in the Genesis account to be understood as a Jebusite, rather than a member of another group in charge of Jerusalem prior to the Jebusites.

Melchizedek, as a priest as well as king, was likely to have been associated with a sanctuary, probably dedicated to Zedek, and scholars suspect that the Temple of Solomon was simply a natural evolution of this sanctuary.

Araunah
Another Jebusite, Araunah (referred to as Ornan by the Books of Chronicles) is described by the Books of Samuel as having sold his threshing floor to King David, which David then constructed an altar on, the implication being that the altar became the core of the Temple of Solomon. Araunah means the lord in Hittite, and so most scholars, since they consider the Jebusites to have been Hittite, have argued that Araunah may have been another king of Jerusalem; some scholars additionally believe that Adonijah is actually a disguised reference to Araunah, the ר (r) having been corrupted to ד (d). The argument originated from Cheyne, who, prior to knowledge of the Hittite language, proposed the reverse. The narrative itself is considered by some scholars to be aetiological and of dubious historicity.

The Jebusite Hypothesis
Some scholars have speculated that as Zadok (also Zadoq) does not appear in the text of Samuel until after the conquest of Jerusalem, he was actually a Jebusite priest co-opted into the Israelite state religion. Frank Moore Cross, professor at the Harvard Divinity School, refers to this theory as the "Jebusite Hypothesis," criticizes it extensively, but terms it the dominant view among contemporary scholars, in Canaanite Myth and Hebrew Epic: Essays in the History of the Religion of Israel.

Elsewhere in the Bible, the Jebusites are described in a manner that suggests that they worshipped the same God (El Elyon—Ēl ‘Elyōn) as the Israelites (see, e.g., Melchizedek). Further support for this theory comes from the fact that other Jebusites resident in pre-Israelite Jerusalem bore names invoking the principle or god Zedek (Tzedek) (see, e.g., Melchizedek and Adonizedek). Under this theory the Aaronic lineage ascribed to Zadok is a later, anachronistic interpolation.

Classical rabbinical perspectives
According to classical rabbinical literature, the Jebusites derived their name from the city of Jebus, the ancient Jerusalem, which they inhabited. These rabbinical sources also argued that as part of the price of Abraham's purchase of the Cave of the Patriarchs (Cave of Machpelah), which lay in the territory of the Jebusites, the Jebusites made Abraham grant them a covenant that his descendants would not take control of Jebus against the will of the Jebusites, and then the Jebusites engraved the covenant into bronze; the sources state that the presence of the bronze statues are why the Israelites were not able to conquer the city during Joshua's campaign.

The rabbis of the classical era go on to state that King David was prevented from entering the city of Jebus for the same reason, and so he promised the reward of captaincy to anyone who destroyed the bronzes – Joab performing the task and so gaining the prize. The covenant is dismissed by the rabbis as having been invalidated due to the war the Jebusites fought against Joshua, but nevertheless David (according to the rabbis) paid the Jebusites the full value of the city, collecting the money from among all the Israelite tribes, so that the city became their common property.

In reference to 2 Samuel 5:6, which refers to a saying about the blind and the lame, Rashi quotes a midrash which argues that the Jebusites had two statues in their city, with their mouths containing the words of the covenant between Abraham and the Jebusites; one figure, depicting a blind person, represented Isaac, and the other, depicting a lame person, representing Jacob.

Modern usage
The politicians Yasser Arafat and Faisal Husseini, among others, have claimed that Palestinian Arabs are descended from the Jebusites, in an attempt to argue that Palestinians have a historic claim to Jerusalem that precedes the Jewish one, similar to the more common Palestinian Arab claim that they are descended from the Canaanites. Thus, the 1978 Al-Mawsu'at Al-Filastinniya (Palestinian encyclopedia) asserted, "The Palestinians [are] the descendants of the Jebusites, who are of Arab origin", and described Jerusalem as "an Arab city because its first builders were the Canaanite Jebusites, whose descendants are the Palestinians."

There is little historical, genetic, cultural, or archaeological evidence to support the claim of Jebusite-Palestinian continuity. Professor Eric H. Cline of the George Washington University Anthropology Department asserts that a general consensus exists among historians and archeologists that modern Palestinians are "more closely related to the Arabs of Saudi Arabia, Yemen, Jordan, and other countries" than to the Jebusites, and that they lack any significant connection to them. The late Johns Hopkins University Professor William F. Albright questioned "the surprising tenacity" of "the myth of the unchanging East" and rejected any assertion of continuity between the "folk beliefs and practices of the modern peasants and nomads" and "pre-Arab times."

See also
 Names of Jerusalem
 Zion
 Proselyte

References

Citations

Sources

 
 
 
 
 
 
 
 
 
 
 
 
 
 

 
Biblical archaeology
Biblical studies
History of Jerusalem